The Embassy of the United Arab Emirates in Washington, D.C. is the diplomatic mission of the United Arab Emirates to the United States. It is located at 3522 International Court, Northwest, Washington, D.C., in the North Cleveland Park neighborhood.

The current ambassador is Yousef Al Otaiba.

References

External links
Official website
Cultural Division website

United Arab Emirates
Washington, D.C.
United Arab Emirates–United States relations
North Cleveland Park